Heinz Raack (18 May 1917 – 26 December 2002) was a German field hockey player who competed in the 1936 Summer Olympics. He made his international debut for Germany in 1935. At the 1936 Olympics, where Germany won the silver medal, he was the youngest member of the squad and played in the match against Denmark. Between 1935-1942 he played for Germany 15 times. He also played for Berliner Sport-Club when they won the first German Hockey Championship in 1937 and successfully defended their title in 1938.

External links
 
Heinz Raack's profile at databaseolypmics.com

1917 births
2002 deaths
Field hockey players at the 1936 Summer Olympics
German male field hockey players
Olympic field hockey players of Germany
Olympic silver medalists for Germany
Olympic medalists in field hockey
Medalists at the 1936 Summer Olympics